Cochylis bunteana is a species of moth of the family Tortricidae. It is found in North America, where it has been recorded from Florida, Illinois, Kentucky, Maine, Maryland, Minnesota, Montana, Ohio, Oklahoma, Ontario and Tennessee.

Adults have been recorded on wing in March and from June to October.

References

Moths described in 1869
Cochylis